Muse: Drones World Tour is a live video by the English rock band Muse, which was released on 12 July 2018 in a worldwide one-night only cinema release, with a home media release at a later date. The video combines four individual concerts together recorded in Germany, Italy and The Netherlands. The concerts were part of their Drones World Tour shows that took place from 2015–16, done in support of their album of the same name.

Background
Details of the video were first hinted at back in May 2016 when on Twitter, Bellamy suggested that some upcoming gigs at the time would be filmed for the future. Then a few days later, cinematographer Hans-Peter van Velthoven, officially confirmed that a film was in progress in collaboration with Corrino Studios. On 16 October 2016, a 4:44 video from the film was leaked online by someone who worked on the film of the band performing "Madness", but was later taken down. The band then fell silent on the project for a year, but continued to state the film was still in progress. On 13 April 2018, the movie along with the poster was accidentally listed onto several cinema chain websites.

The film was officially announced on 26 April 2018, with a one-night only cinema release worldwide on 12 July. A home media release has been confirmed and will be released at a later date, though Bellamy suggested on Twitter that it’ll be digital only with no physical release.

Following the credits, the film showed a teaser of a new song that would be released a week later on 19 July 2018. This song turned out to be "Something Human".

Track listing
 Drones
 Psycho
 Reapers
 Hysteria
 Dead Inside
 The Handler
 Supermassive Black Hole
 Prelude
 Starlight
 Madness
 Time is Running Out
 Uprising
 The Globalist
 Drones (reprise)
 Take a Bow
 Mercy
 Knights of Cydonia

Notes

1. "Hysteria" is preceded by "Interlude" from Absolution (2003).
2. "Knights of Cydonia" is preceded by "Man with a Harmonica", written by Ennio Morricone, and used as an intro.

Personnel
Matthew Bellamy - vocals, guitar, piano
Chris Wolstenholme - bass, backing vocals, rhythm guitar (track 13)
Dominic Howard - drums, percussion, synths (track 15)
Morgan Nicholls – keyboards, synthesizers, backing vocals, cabasa (track 7), other assorted percussion, electronics, guitar (track 5, 9, 10 and 12)

References

External links

2018 films
Muse (band)
2010s English-language films